The 2018 Florida Gators football team represented the University of Florida in the 2018 NCAA Division I FBS football season. The Gators played their home games at Ben Hill Griffin Stadium in Gainesville, Florida. Florida played as a member of the Eastern Division of the Southeastern Conference (SEC). They were led by first-year head coach Dan Mullen.

Florida, coming off a 4–7 season in 2017, began the year unranked. In the second game of the season, not only did the team lose to Kentucky for the first time since 1986, but they also lost to them at home for the first time since 1979, snapping a 31-game winning streak in the series. Florida won its next five games, including on the road against No. 23 Mississippi State and at home against No. 5 LSU, rising to ninth in the AP Poll. They then lost two games to No. 7 Georgia and Missouri and ended the conference regular season tied for second in the SEC East Division at 5–3. After closing the regular season by defeating rival Florida State, they were invited to the Peach Bowl, where they defeated No. 8 Michigan by a score of 41–15. The team finished with an overall record of 10–3, and in the season's final AP Poll, the team was ranked in a tie for seventh, the highest finish for the school since 2009.

The team was led on offense by redshirt sophomore quarterback Feleipe Franks, who finished with 2,457 passing yards, 24 passing touchdowns, and 7 rushing touchdowns. His 31 total touchdowns was tied for third in the Southeastern Conference. Running backs La'Mical Perine and Jordan Scarlett finished with 826 and 776 yards, respectively. Defensively, the team was led by defensive end Jachai Polite, who finished with 20 tackles for loss and was named first-team All-SEC.

Previous season
The Gators in 2017 were led by third-year head coach Jim McElwain through the end of October until his firing. Randy Shannon was named the interim head coach on October 29. They finished the season 4–7, 3–5 in SEC play to finish in fifth place in the Eastern Division.

Preseason

Award watch lists
Listed in the order that they were released

SEC media poll
The SEC media poll was released on July 20, 2018 with the Gators predicted to finish third in the East Division.

Preseason All-SEC teams
The Gators had eight players selected to the preseason all-SEC teams.

Offense

1st team

Martez Ivey – OL

3rd team

Jordan Scarlett – RB

Defense

1st team

CeCe Jefferson – DL

2nd team

C. J. Gardner-Johnson – DB

C. J. Henderson – DB

3rd team

David Reese – LB

Marco Wilson – DB

Specialists

3rd team

Kadarius Toney – all purpose player

Schedule

Rankings

Game summaries

Charleston Southern

Kentucky

Colorado State

Tennessee

Mississippi State

LSU

Vanderbilt

Georgia

Missouri

South Carolina

Idaho

Florida State

Michigan (Peach Bowl)

Personnel

Roster

  Redshirt
  Injury

Coaching staff

Recruits
The Gators signed a total of 19 recruits.

Players drafted into the NFL

References

Florida
Florida Gators football seasons
Peach Bowl champion seasons
Florida Gators football